Monterey is an unincorporated community in Fulton County, Illinois, United States. Monterey is located on Illinois Route 9, northwest of Banner and southeast of Canton.

Monterey is home to a Methodist church.,

References

Unincorporated communities in Fulton County, Illinois
Unincorporated communities in Illinois